William Hughes FRGS (1818 – 21 May 1876) was an English geographer, cartographer, author and academic.

Life
In early life Hughes was in business as an engraver in Pentonville, London. In 1840 he became a lecturer at St John's College, Battersea.

Hughes was Professor of Geography at King's College and Queen's College, London and Royal Female Naval School. He was for many years Examiner in Geography to the College of Preceptors. He died at his home, Adelaide Road, St John's Wood, London.

Works
Hughes was the author of many books; atlases for the classroom, and books for biblical studies and general reference. He was also a prolific editor of reference works and textbooks. Some of his publications were later revised by Sir Richard Gregory, and by John Francon Williams.

Partial bibliography
Directions for Taking Instructions on Wills 1840
Three Students of Grays Inn (novel) 1846
The Stamp Duties Act 1850
The Origin and Condition of  the Australian Colonies Longman & Co. 1852
Manual of Mathematical Geography 1852
A Manual of Geography, Physical, Industrial and Political 1852
It's All for the Best (3-volume novel) 1853
A Class-book of Modern Geography 1859
Philips' Family Atlas of Physical, General and Classical Geography 1859
A Manual of Geography
Manual of British Geography
Elementary Class-book of Modern Geography 1860
A Manual of European Geography 1861
A Class-book of Physical Geography 1861
Outlines of Geography 1864
The Geography of River Systems 1865
Elementary Class-book of Physical Geography 1866
Geography in its Relation to History 1870
Geography of the British Isles 1887
Bible Maps  pub. John W. Parker, London
Philips' Atlas of Scripture Geography
Hughes W. (Revised by R. A. Gregory) An Elementary Classbook of Physical Geography 1904
General Geography, Simplified for beginners (in Gleig's School Series)
Geography of the British Empire, Simplified for beginners (in Gleig's School Series)
The Child's First Book of Geography (in Gleig's School Series)

Further reading
Vaughan, J. E. "William Hughes, FRGS (1818–1876) as Geographical Educationist". In W. E. Marsden (ed.) Historical Perspectives on Geographical Education (IGU Commission on Geographical Education: University of London Institute of Education, 1980)

References

English cartographers
English engravers
English geographers
1818 births
1876 deaths
19th-century English writers
Fellows of the Royal Geographical Society
Academics of King's College London